The Truce (La Tregua) is an autobiographical book by Primo Levi.

The Truce may also refer to:
 The Truce (1974 film), a film based on Benedetti's novel
 The Truce (1997 film), an adaptation of Primo Levi's book
 La tregua, a 1960 novel by Mario Benedetti

See also
Truce (disambiguation)